Rahul Vishwakarma (born  19 October 1992) is a Nepalese cricketer. He is a left-handed batsman and a left-arm orthodox spinner. He made his debut for Nepal against Malaysia in October 2007.

He played for the Sagarmatha Legends of the Nepal Premier League, Nepal Army Club of the National League and Pentagon International College, which plays in the SPA Cup.

Career 
Vishwakarma first appeared in the 2007 ACC Under-19 Elite Cup. He was selected in the senior squad that same year. The spinner debuted against Malaysia in the 2007 ACC Twenty20 Cup and got three wickets in his first match.

Vishwakarma participated in the 2010 Division Five, which Nepal hosted. In the final against the United States, Vishwakarma led his team to victory with career-best figures, dismissing seven batters, and was awarded the Man of the Match title.

In his last two games for Nepal during the 2013 Division Three tournament held in Bermuda, Vishwakarma took a total of five wickets.

He took seven wickets against USA in the 2010 Division Five, five wickets against Tanzania in the 2010 Division Four, three against Italy and two against Uganda in the final of the 2013 Division Three, and three wickets against Oman in the 2010 ACC Trophy Elite tournament.

References

External links 
 

1992 births
Living people
People from Rupandehi District
Nepalese cricketers
Cricketers at the 2010 Asian Games
Asian Games competitors for Nepal